Fedjeosen is a strait or stretch of open sea in Vestland county, Norway. It is located between the island of Fedje in Fedje Municipality and the island of Nordøyane in Øygarden Municipality. Hellisøy Lighthouse is located at the northern side of Fedjeosen.

References

Landforms of Vestland
Straits of Norway
Fedje
Øygarden